The 1994 All-Ireland Junior Hurling Championship was the 73rd staging of the All-Ireland Junior Championship since its establishment by the Gaelic Athletic Association in 1912. The championship began on 11 May 1994 and ended on 17 July 1994.

Clare entered the championship as the defending champions, however, they were beaten by Cork in the Munster final.

The All-Ireland final was played on 17 July 1994 at Fraher Field in Dungarvan, between Cork and Kilkenny, in what was their first meeting in the final in 78 years. Cork won the match by 2-13 to 2-11 to claim their 11th championship title overall and a first title since 1987.

Kilkenny's Ollie O'Connor was the championship's top scorer with 3-22.

Participating teams

A number of teams withdrew from the provincial championships after initially expressing an interest in fielding teams. Kerry withdrew from the Munster Championship while Carlow, Kildare and Meath withdrew from the Leinster Championship. Fermanagh won the Ulster Championship but did not progress to the All-Ireland Championship.

Results

Leinster Junior Hurling Championship

Leinster quarter-finals

Leinster semi-finals

Leinster final

Munster Junior Hurling Championship

Munster first round

Munster semi-finals

Munster final

All-Ireland Junior Hurling Championship

All-Ireland semi-finals

All-Ireland final

Championship statistics

Top scorers

Top scorers overall

Top scorers in a single game

References

Junior
All-Ireland Junior Hurling Championship